Ray Steiner Cline (June 4, 1918 – March 16, 1996) was an official at the United States Central Intelligence Agency and is best known for being the chief CIA analyst during the Cuban Missile Crisis.

Early life and family
Ray S. Cline was born in Anderson Township, Clark County, Illinois in 1918 and raised in Terre Haute, Indiana, graduating from Wiley High School in 1935. He earned a scholarship to study at Harvard University where he graduated with an A.B. in 1939.  He received the Henry Prize Fellowship to Balliol College, Oxford University 1939-40. He returned to Harvard and earned an M.A. He was invited to join the Harvard Society of Fellows in 1941, but with the outbreak of World War II, he left after a year to join the war effort. Cline married Majorie Wilson in 1941; the couple had two daughters, Judith and Sibyl. Until Sibyl's divorce, Cline was the father-in-law of Stefan Halper.

Career

U.S. Government
Cline served in World War II first as a cryptanalyst for the U.S. Department of the Navy (1942-1943) and then joined the newly created  Office of Strategic Services.  He became Chief of Current Intelligence in 1944, serving until 1946.  He later traveled to China where he worked with other OSS officers such as John K. Singlaub, Richard Helms, E. Howard Hunt, Paul Helliwell, Robert Emmett Johnson, and Lucien Conein.  In 1946, he was assigned to the Operations Division of the General Staff of the United States Department of War, tasked with writing the history of the Operations Division.

According to Sterling Seagrave, Edward Lansdale found a large cache in caves and tunnels in the Philippines after World War II ended. Cline stated that both Paul Helliwell and Robert Anderson created 176 "black gold" banking accounts in 42 countries after moving loot from the Philippines by ship to support future United States operations.

Cline joined the newly founded Central Intelligence Agency in 1949 as an intelligence analyst, having completed his Ph.D. at Harvard that year.  He was initially responsible for intelligence on Korea, but he failed to predict North Korea's 1950 invasion of South Korea, which began the Korean War.  From 1951 to 1953, he served as an attaché at the U.S. Embassy in Great Britain under the supervision of Brigadier General E. C. Betts.  From 1953 to 1957, he was the CIA desk officer charged with monitoring the Soviet Union and the People's Republic of China; in this capacity, he correctly predicted the Sino-Soviet split.  In 1958 he became Chief of the CIA station in Taiwan, with his official title being chief of the United States Naval Auxiliary Communications Center.

In 1962, Cline moved to Washington, D.C. as the head of CIA's Directorate of Intelligence, the agency's analytical branch. He replaced Robert Amory Jr who had held this Office in 1953–1962.  Cline played a crucial role in the Cuban Missile Crisis when, under Cline's leadership, the Directorate of Intelligence concluded after study of U2 spy plane photographs of Cuba that the Soviet Union had shipped nuclear warheads to Cuba; Cline was among those who informed President John F. Kennedy of this development.

Cline played a role in the formation of the World League for Freedom and Democracy in 1966.

Cline remained head of the Directorate of Intelligence until 1966, when, disillusioned with President Lyndon B. Johnson, he determined to leave the CIA.  His old friend Richard Helms intervened to have Cline posted as Special Coordinator and Adviser to the United States Ambassador to Germany in Bonn.

In 1969, Cline returned to the United States when President Richard Nixon nominated him as Director of the Bureau of Intelligence and Research and he subsequently held this office from October 26, 1969 until November 24, 1973.  In this capacity, he oversaw U.S. intelligence in the build-up to the Yom Kippur War.

Academic
Cline left government service in 1973, becoming an executive director of the Center for Strategic and International Studies at Georgetown University.  While at the Center for Strategic and International Studies, he became a prolific author on American intelligence and foreign policy.  He also became an ardent defender of the CIA in testimony before the United States Congress and in the media.

Cline was head of the U.S. Global Strategy Council.

Publications

Books
Washington Command Post. U.S. Department of the Army (1951).
World Power Assessment: The Calculus of Strategic Drift. Boulder, Colo.: Westview Press (1975). .
 Published in cooperation with the Center for Strategic and International Studies, Georgetown University, Washington, D.C.
Secrets, Spies and Scholars: The CIA from Roosevelt to Reagan. Washington D.C.: Acropolis Books (1976). .
Republished as The CIA Under Reagan, Bush, and Casey. Washington, D.C.: Acropolis Books (1981).
World Power Assessment 1977: A Calculus of Strategic Drift. Boulder, Colo.: Westview Press (1977). .
 Published in cooperation with the Center for Strategic and International Studies, Georgetown University, Washington, D.C.
World Power Trends and U.S. Foreign Policy for the 1980s. Boulder, Colo.: Westview Press (1980). . .
 Published in cooperation with the Center for Strategic and International Studies, Georgetown University, Washington, D.C.
 The CIA Under Reagan, Bush, and Casey (1982).
 Republished as CIA: Reality v Myth.
 The Intelligence War. Salamander Books (1983).
 Central Intelligence Agency Under Reagan, Bush and Casey (1982).
Terrorism: The Soviet Connection, with Yonah Alexander. New York: Crane Russak (1985). .
 Published in cooperation with the Center for Strategic and International Studies, Georgetown University.
 Western Europe in Soviet Global Strategy (1987) .
 Metastrategy. New York: Crane Russak (1988).
 Central Intelligence Agency: A Photographic History (1989).
 Foreign Policy Failures in China, Cuba, and Nicaragua: A Paradigm. Washington, D.C.: United States Global Strategy Council (1992).
Chiang Ching-Kuo Remembered: The Man and His Political Legacy Washington: United States Global Strategy Council (1993).
The Power of Nations in the 1990s: A Strategic Assessment. Washington: University Press of America (1995). Foreword by Paul H. Nitze. . .

Book contributions
 Introduction to Red Cocaine: The Drugging of America, by Joseph D. Douglass, Jr. Second Opinion Pub, Inc. (1990), pp. 7-10.
 New York: Edward Harle (1999). Revised 2nd ed. Preface by Christopher Story. . .

Articles 
 "Opinion: Policy without Intelligence." Foreign Policy, no. 17 (Winter 1974), pp. 121–135. . .
 "Toward a Two Chinas Policy." Asian Affairs, vol. 3, no. 5 (May/June 1976), pp. 281–286. .
 "Politics and Foreign Policy." Wilson Quarterly, vol. 4, no. 3 (Summer 1980), p. 189. Woodrow Wilson International Center for Scholars. .

 "Correction: In Pursuit of Well-Being." Wilson Quarterly, vol. 4, no. 3 (Summer 1980), p. 189. Woodrow Wilson International Center for Scholars. .
 "The Communist Five and the Capitalist Ten Socio-Economic Systems in Asia." Journal of East Asian Affairs, vol. 2, no. 1 (Spring/Summer 1982), pp. 1–14. Institute for National Security Strategy. .
 "Commentary: The Cuban Missile Crisis." Foreign Affairs, vol. 68, no. 4 (Fall 1989), pp. 190–196. Council on Foreign Relations. . .

Awards
 Distinguished Intelligence Medal
 Career Intelligence Medal

See also
 M-Fund

Notes

References

Further reading

External links
 Ray Cline at IMDb

1918 births
1996 deaths
Harvard Fellows
Harvard University alumni
People from Clark County, Illinois
People of the Central Intelligence Agency
People of the Office of Strategic Services
United States Assistant Secretaries of State